Pegadas de Dinossáurios da Serra de Aire Natural Monument is a natural monument in the Serras de Aire e Candeeiros Natural Park, Portugal, known for its sauropod tracks. It has the single longest known sauropod track in the world ( long). It is part of the Calcários Micríticos formation.

It has around 20 different trails, all of which are part of a large limestone slab preserved for over 175 million years.

Origin
The formation dates back to the middle Jurassic Period (between the Bajocian and Bathonian ages). At that time, Europe was still connected to the North American continent and, between Iberia and Newfoundland, penetrated a shallow sea of warm and clear waters, conducive to the formation of coral reefs.

The area in itself was a coastal plain, full of periodically flooded areas, consequence of aquifers, one to two meters thick. Geological interactions millions of years later gave rise to what is now the Serra de Aire mountain range, to which the slab sits slightly inclinated at around  altitude.

History
The area was originally a quarry, the Pedreira do Galinha.

On July 2, 1994, Ricardo Matos da Silva, João Pedro Falcão and João Carvalho, discovered the footprints that would turn the quarry into the current monument.

Gallery

References

Protected areas of Portugal
Paleontology in Portugal
Fossil trackways